According to preliminary data from the US Energy Information Administration, renewable energy accounted for about 12.6% of total primary energy consumption and about 19.8% of the domestically produced electricity in the United States in 2020.

Since 2019, wind power has been the largest producer of renewable electricity in the country. Wind power generated 337.9 terawatt-hours of electricity in 2020, which accounted for 8.4% of the nation's total electricity generation and 43.2% of the total renewable electricity generation. By October 2021, the United States nameplate generating capacity for wind power was 129,256 megawatts (MW). Texas remained firmly established as the leader in wind power deployment, followed by Iowa and Oklahoma as of year end 2020.
  
Hydroelectric power is the second-largest producer of renewable electricity in the country, generating around 7.3% of the nation's total electricity in 2020 as well as 36.4% of the total renewable electricity generation. 
The United States is the fourth largest producer of hydroelectricity in the world after China, Canada and Brazil.

Solar power provides a growing share of electricity in the country, with over 50 GW of installed capacity generating about 1.3% of the country's total electricity supply in 2017, up from 0.9% the previous year.
As of 2016, more than 260,000 people worked in the solar industry and 43 states deployed net metering, where energy utilities bought back excess power generated by solar arrays. Large photovoltaic power plants in the United States include Mount Signal Solar (600 MW) and Solar Star (579 MW). Since the United States pioneered solar thermal power technology in the 1980s with Solar One, several more such power stations have been built. The largest of these solar thermal power stations are the Ivanpah Solar Power Facility (392 MW), southwest of Las Vegas, and the SEGS group of plants in the Mojave Desert, with a total generating capacity of 354 MW.

Other renewable energy sources include geothermal, with The Geysers in Northern California the largest geothermal complex in the world.

The development of renewable energy and energy efficiency marked "a new era of energy exploration" in the United States, according to former President Barack Obama. In a joint address to the Congress on February 24, 2009, President Obama called for doubling renewable energy within the following three years. Renewable energy reached a major milestone in the first quarter of 2011, when it contributed 11.7% of total national energy production (660 TWh), surpassing energy production from nuclear power (620 TWh) for the first time since 1997.
In his 2012 State of the Union address, President Barack Obama restated his commitment to renewable energy and mentioned the long-standing Interior Department commitment to permit 10,000 MW of renewable energy projects on public land in 2012.

Rationale for renewables
Renewable energy technologies encompass a broad, diverse array of technologies, including solar photovoltaics, solar thermal power plants and heating/cooling systems, wind farms, hydroelectricity, geothermal power plants, and ocean power systems and the use of biomass.

The report Outlook On Renewable Energy In America explains that America needs renewable energy, for many reasons:
America needs energy that is secure, reliable, improves public health, protects the environment, addresses climate change, creates jobs, and provides technological leadership. America needs renewable energy. If renewable energy is to be developed to its full potential, America will need coordinated, sustained federal and state policies that expand renewable energy markets; promote and deploy new technology; and provide appropriate opportunities to encourage renewable energy use in all critical energy market sectors: wholesale and distributed electricity generation, thermal energy applications, and transportation. 

Another benefit of some renewable energy technologies, like wind and solar photovoltaics (PV) is that they require little or no water to generate electricity whereas thermoelectric (fossil fuel-based) power plants require vast amounts of water for operation.

In 2009, President Barack Obama in the inaugural address called for the expanded use of renewable energy to meet the twin challenges of energy security and climate change. Those were the first references ever to the nation's energy use, to renewable resources, and to climate change in an inauguration speech of a United States president. President Obama looked to the near future, saying that as a nation, the United States will "harness the sun and the winds and the soil to fuel our cars and run our factories."

The president's New Energy For America plan calls for a federal investment of $150 billion over the next decade to catalyze private efforts to build a clean energy future. Specifically, the plan calls for renewable energy to supply 10% of the nation's electricity by 2012, rising to 25% by 2025.

In his joint address to Congress in 2009, Obama stated that: "We know the country that harnesses the power of clean, renewable energy will lead the 21st century.... Thanks to our recovery plan, we will double this nation’s supply of renewable energy in the next three years... It is time for America to lead again".

As of 2011, new evidence has emerged that there are considerable risks associated with traditional energy sources, and that major changes to the mix of energy technologies is needed: 
Several mining tragedies globally have underscored the human toll of the coal supply chain. New EPA initiatives targeting air toxins, coal ash, and effluent releases highlight the environmental impacts of coal and the cost of addressing them with control technologies. The use of fracking in natural gas exploration is coming under scrutiny, with evidence of groundwater contamination and greenhouse gas emissions. Concerns are increasing about the vast amounts of water used at coal-fired and nuclear power plants, particularly in regions of the country facing water shortages. Events at the Fukushima nuclear plant have renewed doubts about the ability to operate large numbers of nuclear plants safely over the long term. Further, cost estimates for “next generation” nuclear units continue to climb, and lenders are unwilling to finance these plants without taxpayer guarantees.

Renewable energy and carbon dioxide emissions 

Between 2010 and 2020, the cost of wind, solar, and natural gas dropped dramatically. In 2018, EIA expected that, after rising by 2.7% in 2018, U.S. energy-related carbon dioxide (CO2) emissions would decrease by 2.5% in 2019 and by 1.0% in 2020 due to a shift away from coal and toward renewables and natural gas.

Renewable energy has the potential to reduce CO2 emissions in three key energy use sectors: transport, heating and cooling (including building heating and air conditioning, industrial heat usage, etc.), and electricity. The year 2018 had been a peak year for the use of air conditioning, which was expected to decline.

Current trends

Renewable energy in the electricity sector 

Notes: 
1 Total electricity energy generation by US utilities.
2 Estimated solar small-scale photovoltaics US Generation
3 Sum of US utility generation and solar small-scale generation
4 Solar utility generation and solar small-scale estimate
5 Bio includes wood, wood-derived products, waste, landfill gas, and other.* 2021 data is preliminary from EPM

Renewable energy accounted for 14.94% of the domestically produced electricity in 2016 in the United States. This proportion has grown from just 7.7% in 2001, although the trend is sometimes obscured by large yearly variations in hydroelectric power generation. Most of the growth since 2001 can be seen in the expansion of wind generated power, and more recently, in the growth in solar generated power. Renewable energy in California is prominent, with around 29% of electricity coming from RPS-eligible renewable sources (including hydropower).

The United States has some of the best renewable energy resources in the world, with the potential to meet a rising and significant share of the nation's energy demand. 
A quarter of the country's land area has winds strong enough to generate electricity at the same price as natural gas and coal.

Many of the new technologies that harness renewables—including wind, solar, geothermal, and biofuels—are, or soon will be, economically competitive with the fossil fuels that meet 85% of United States energy needs. Dynamic growth rates are driving down costs and spurring rapid advances in technologies. Wind power and solar power are becoming increasingly important relative to the older and more established hydroelectric power source. By 2016 wind power covered 37.23% of total renewable electricity production against 43.62% for hydroelectric power. The remaining share of power was generated by biomass at 10.27%, solar power at 6.03% and geothermal with 2.86% of total renewable generation.

In 2015, Georgetown, Texas became one of the first American cities to be powered entirely by renewable energy, choosing to do so for financial stability reasons.

The United States consumed about 4,000 TWh of electricity in 2012, and about 30,000 TWh (98 quadrillion BTU) of primary energy. Efficiency improvements are expected to reduce usage to 15,000 TWh by 2050.

Future projections 
Using data from Electric Power Annual 2018 capacity projections, the expected changes in generating capabilities for renewable fuel sources  would result in an increase of 55.873 GW  of capacity coming on-line by the beginning of 2024. This would make a total of 277.77 gigawatts of renewable available by 2024 up 23.1% from 2018.  Using this generating capability and the capacity factors from 2018 data will result in a total of 798.19 terawatt-hours (TWh) of renewable electric energy in 2023. This would be up 61.84  TWh (+8.3%) from 2018.

Renewable electricity sources

Hydroelectricity

Hydroelectric power was the largest producer of renewable power in the United States until 2019 when it was overtaken by wind power. 
It produced 79.89 TWh which was 7% of the nation's total electricity in 2018 and provided 40.9% of the total renewable power in the country. 
The United States is the fourth largest producer of hydroelectricity in the world after China, Canada and Brazil. 
The Grand Coulee Dam is the 7th largest hydroelectric power station in the world and another six U.S. hydroelectric plants are among the 50 largest in the world. 
The amount of hydroelectric power generated is strongly affected by changes in precipitation and surface runoff.
Hydroelectricity projects such as Hoover Dam, Grand Coulee Dam, and the Tennessee Valley Authority have become iconic large construction projects.

Wind power

Wind power capacity in the United States tripled from 2008 to 2016, at which time it supplied over 5% of the country's total electricity generation.  Wind power overtook hydroelectric as the largest source of renewable electricity generation in 2019, and accounted for 9% of the country's total electricity generation by in 2020.
Wind and solar accounted for two-thirds of new energy installations in the United States in 2015.
United States wind power installed capacity exceeds 81 GW as of 2017. 
This capacity is exceeded only by China.

The 1550MW Alta Wind Energy Center is the largest wind farm in the United States and the second largest in the world behind the Gansu Wind Farm.

There were 90,000 wind operations jobs in the United States in 2015. 
The wind industry in the United States generates tens of thousands of jobs and billions of dollars of economic activity. 
Wind projects boost local tax bases, and revitalize the economy of rural communities by providing a steady income stream to farmers with wind turbines on their land. 
GE Energy is the largest domestic wind turbine manufacturer.

In 2013, wind power received $5.936 billion in federal funding, which is 37% of all federal funding for electricity generation.

The United States has the potential of installing 10 terawatt (TW) of onshore wind power and 4 TW of offshore wind. 
The U.S. Department of Energy's report 20% Wind Energy by 2030 envisioned that wind power could supply 20% of all the country's electricity, which included a contribution of 4% from offshore wind power. 
Additional transmission lines will need to be added, to bring power from windy states to the rest of the country. 
In August 2011, a coalition of 24 governors asked the Obama administration to provide a more favorable business climate for the development of wind power.

Solar power

The United States is one of the world's largest producers of solar power.
The country pioneered solar farms and many key developments in concentrated solar and photovoltaics came out of national research.

In 2016, utility scale solar contributed 36.76 TWh to the grid, with 33.367 TWh from photovoltaics and 3.39 TWh from thermal systems. 
In 2014, 2015, and 2016, EIA estimated that distributed solar generated 11.233 TWh, 14.139 TWh and 19.467 TWh respectively. 
While utility-grade systems have well documented generation, distributed systems contributions to user electric power needs are not measured or controlled. 
Therefore, quantitative evaluation of distributed solar to the country's electric power sector has been lacking. 
Recently, the Energy Information Administration has begun estimating that contribution. 
Before 2008, most solar-generated electric energy was from thermal systems, however by 2011 photovoltaics had overtaken thermal.

Photovoltaics

At the end of 2016, the United States had 19.77 gigawatts (GW) of installed utility-scale photovoltaic capacity. The United States has some of the largest solar farms in the world. Mount Signal Solar had installed over 600 MW by 2018 and will have 800 MW of capacity upon completion. Solar Star is a 579 megawatt (MWAC) farm near Rosamond, California. The Desert Sunlight Solar Farm is a 550 MW solar power plant in Riverside County, California, that uses thin-film solar photovoltaic modules made by First Solar. The Topaz Solar Farm is a 550 MW photovoltaic power plant, in San Luis Obispo County, California. The Blythe Solar Power Project is a 485 MW photovoltaic station planned for Riverside County, California.

Many schools and businesses have building-integrated photovoltaic solar panels on their roof. Most of these are grid connected and use net metering laws to allow use of electricity in the evening that was generated during the daytime. New Jersey leads the nation with the least restrictive net metering law, while California leads in total number of homes which have solar panels installed. Many were installed because of the million solar roof initiative. California decided that it is not moving forward fast enough on photovoltaic generation and in 2008 enacted a feed-in tariff. Washington state has a feed-in tariff of 15 ¢/kWh which increases to 54 ¢/kWh if components are manufactured in the state. By 2015, California, Hawaii, Arizona and some other states were lowering payments to distributed solar owners and instituting new fees for grid usage. Tesla and a handful of other companies were promoting household grid-tied batteries while some electric companies were investing in utility-scale grid energy storage including very large batteries.

Beginning with the 2014 data year,  Energy Information Administration has estimated distributed solar photovoltaic generation and distributed solar photovoltaic capacity. 
These non-utility scale estimates that the United States, generated the following additional electric energy from such distributed solar PV systems.

Concentrated solar power

At the end of 2016 there were 1.76 GW total installed capacity of solar thermal power across the United States.
Solar thermal power is generally utility-scale.
To streamline consideration of applications, the BLM produced a Programmatic Environmental Impact Statement (PEIS). 
By the subsequent Record of Decision in October 2012, the BLM withdrew 78% of its land from possible solar development, leaving  still open to applications for solar installations, an area nearly as large as South Carolina. Of the area left open to solar proposals, the BLM has identified 285 thousand acres in 17 highly favorable areas it calls Solar Energy Zones.

Solar thermal power plants designed for solar-only generation are well matched to summer noon peak loads in prosperous areas with significant cooling demands, such as the south-western United States. 
Using thermal energy storage systems, solar thermal operating periods can even be extended to meet base-load needs.

A 2013 study by the US National Renewable Energy Laboratory concluded that utility-scale solar power plants directly disturb an average of 2.7 to 2.9 acres per gigawatt-hour/year, and use from 3.5 to 3.8 acres per gW-hr/year for the entire sites. 
According to a 2009 study, this intensity of land use is less than that of the country's average power plant using surface-mined coal. Some of the land in the eastern portion of the Mojave Desert is to be preserved, but the solar industry is more interested in areas of the western desert, "where the sun burns hotter and there is easier access to transmission lines".

Some of the largest solar thermal power plants in the United States are in the south-west of the country, especially in the Mojave Desert.
Solar Energy Generating Systems (SEGS) is the name given to nine solar power plants in the Mojave Desert commissioned between 1984 and 1991.
The installation uses parabolic trough solar thermal technology along with natural gas to generate electricity. 
The facility has a total of 400,000 mirrors and covers 1,000 acres (4 km2).
The plants have a total generating capacity of 354 MW.

Nevada Solar One generates 64MW of power and in Boulder City, Nevada, and was built by the U.S. Department of Energy (DOE), National Renewable Energy Laboratory (NREL), and Solargenix Energy. Nevada Solar One started producing electricity in June 2007.
Nevada Solar One uses parabolic troughs as thermal solar concentrators, heating tubes of liquid which act as solar receivers. These solar receivers are specially coated tubes made of glass and steel.  About 19,300 of these 4 metre long tubes are used in the newly built power plant. Nevada Solar One also uses a technology that collects extra heat by putting it into phase-changing molten salts.  This energy can then be drawn on at night.

The Ivanpah Solar Power Facility is a 392 megawatt (MW) solar power facility which is located in south-eastern California. The facility formally opened on February 13, 2014.
The 250MW Mojave Solar Project is located near Barstow, California.

Geothermal power

The United States is the world leader in online capacity and the generation of electricity from geothermal energy. 
According to 2018 state energy data, geothermal energy provided approximately 16 terawatt-hours (TWh) of electricity, or 0.38% of the total electricity consumed in the country. 
As of May 2007, geothermal electric power was generated in five states: Alaska, California, Hawaii, Nevada, and Utah.
According to the Geothermal Energy Association's recent report, there were 75 new geothermal power projects underway in 12 states as of May 2007.
This is an increase of 14 projects in an additional three states compared to a survey completed in November 2006.

The most significant catalyst behind new industry activity is the Energy Policy Act of 2005. 
This Act made new geothermal plants eligible for the full federal production tax credit, previously available only to wind power projects. 
It also authorized and directed increased funding for research by the Department of Energy, and gave the Bureau of Land Management new legal guidance and secure funding to address its backlog of geothermal leases and permits.

The contribution over the last sixteen years of geothermal power to the renewable power generation and to the total US power generation is shown below along with the yearly profile of the geothermal power generation for 2019 (2018) where 2.46 (2.44) GW of capacity produced 16.11 (15.97)  TWh of energy.

Biomass
In 2019, biomass generated 58.412 terawatt-hours (TWh) of electricity, or 1.41% of the country's total electricity production. 
Biomass was the largest source of renewable primary energy in the US, and the fourth-largest renewable source of electrical power in the US, after wind, hydropower, and solar.

Biomass electric generation data combines two basic categories:
 Wood and wood-derived fuels including wood/wood waste solids (including paper pellets, railroad ties, utility poles, wood chips, bark and wood waste solids), wood waste liquids (red liquor, sludge wood, spent sulfite liquor, and other wood-based liquids), and black liquor;
 Other biomass fuels include municipal solid waste, landfill gas, sludge waste agricultural byproducts, other biomass solids, other biomass liquids, and other biomass gases (including digester gases, methane, and other biomass gases)

The contribution from these two categories over the last fifteen years of biomass electric power to the renewable power generation and to the total US power generation is shown below along with the yearly profile of the electric power generation for 2018 and 2017. 
This shows the typical variations over the months of the year due to fuel availability and needs.

Wave power

Wave power in the United States is under development in several locations off the east and west coasts as well as Hawaii. It has moved beyond the research phase and is producing reliable energy. Its use to-date has been for situations where other forms of energy production are not economically viable and as such, the power output is currently modest. But major installations are planned to come on-line within the next few years.

Solar water heating
The U.S. Department of Energy stated (in 2006) that more than 1.5 million homes and businesses were currently using solar water heating in the United States, representing a capacity of over 1,000 megawatts (MW) of thermal energy generation. It predicted that another 400 MW was likely to be installed over the next 3–5 years.

Assuming that 40 percent of existing homes in the United States have adequate access to sunlight, 29 million solar water heaters could be installed.

Solar water heaters can operate in any climate. Performance varies depending on how much solar energy is available at the site, as well as how cold the water coming into the system is. The colder the water, the more efficiently the system operates. 
 
Solar water heaters reduce the need for conventional water heating by about two-thirds and pay for their installation within 4 to 8 years with electricity or natural gas savings. Compared to those with electric water heaters, Florida homeowners with solar water heaters save 50 to 85 percent on their water heating bills, according to the Florida Solar Energy Center.

Biofuels

Many cars sold in the U.S. since 2001 are able to run on blends of up to 15% ethanol.
Older cars in the United States can run on blends of up to 10% ethanol. Motor vehicle manufacturers already produce vehicles designed to run on much higher ethanol blends. Ford, DaimlerChrysler, and GM are among the automobile companies that sell “flexible-fuel” cars, trucks, and minivans that can use gasoline and ethanol blends ranging from pure gasoline up to 85% ethanol (E85). By mid-2006, there were approximately 6 million E85-compatible vehicles on the road.

Ninety-five percent of gasoline sold in the U.S.(2016) is blended with 10% ethanol. There are challenges in moving to higher blends, however. Flex-fuel vehicles are assisting in this transition because they allow drivers to choose different fuels based on price and availability. The USDA in 2015 began offering grants to help gasoline retailers install blender pumps for dispensing mid-level ethanol blends.

The expanding ethanol and biodiesel industries are providing jobs in plant construction, operations, and maintenance, mostly in rural communities. According to the Renewable Fuels Association, the ethanol industry created almost 154,000 jobs in 2005 alone, boosting household income by $5.7 billion. It also contributed about $3.5 billion in tax revenues at the local, state, and federal levels. On the other hand, in 2010, the biofuel industry received $6.64 billion in federal government support.

Renewable energy research
There are numerous organizations within the academic, federal, and commercial sectors conducting large-scale advanced research in the field of renewable energy. This research spans several areas of focus across the renewable energy spectrum. Most of the research is targeted at improving efficiency and increasing overall energy yields. 
Multiple federally supported research organizations have focused on renewable energy in recent years. Two of the most prominent of these labs are Sandia National Laboratories (SNL) and the National Renewable Energy Laboratory (NREL), both of which are funded by the United States Department of Energy and supported by various corporate partners. Sandia has a total budget of $2.4 billion while NREL has a budget of $375 million.

Both the SNL and the NREL, have heavily funded solar research programs. BP was also heavily invested in solar research programs until 2008 when the company began scaling back its solar operations. The company finally shut down its forty-year-old solar business after executives decided solar power production is not economically competitive.  The NREL solar program has a budget of around $75 million and develops research projects in the areas of photovoltaic (PV) technology, solar thermal energy, and solar radiation.  The budget for Sandia's solar division is unknown, however it accounts for a significant percentage of the laboratory's $2.4 billion budget. Several academic programs have focused on solar research in recent years. The Solar Energy Research Center (SERC) at University of North Carolina (UNC) has the sole purpose of developing cost effective solar technology.  In 2008, researchers at Massachusetts Institute of Technology (MIT) developed a method to store solar energy by using it to produce hydrogen fuel from water.  Such research is targeted at addressing the obstacle that solar development faces of storing energy for use during nighttime hours when the sun is not shining. 
In February 2012, North Carolina-based Semprius Inc., a solar development company backed by German corporation Siemens, announced that they had developed the world's most efficient solar panel. The company claims that the prototype converts 33.9% of the sunlight that hits it to electricity, more than double the previous high-end conversion rate.

Wind energy research dates back several decades to the 1970s when NASA developed an analytical model to predict wind turbine power generation during high winds. Today, both the SNL and NREL have programs dedicated to wind research. Sandia's laboratory focuses on the advancement of materials, aerodynamics, and sensors.  The NREL wind projects are centered on improving wind plant power production, reducing their capital costs, and making wind energy more cost effective overall.
The Field Laboratory for Optimized Wind Energy (FLOWE) at Caltech was established to research renewable approaches to wind energy farming technology practices that have the potential to reduce the cost, size, and environmental impact of wind energy production.

As the primary source of biofuels in North America, many organizations are conducting research in the area of ethanol production. On the Federal level, the USDA conducts a large amount of research regarding ethanol production in the United States. Much of this research is targeted toward the effect of ethanol production on domestic food markets.
The National Renewable Energy Laboratory has conducted various ethanol research projects, mainly in the area of cellulosic ethanol. Cellulosic ethanol has many benefits over traditional corn-based ethanol. It does not take away or directly conflict with the food supply because it is produced from wood, grasses, or non-edible parts of plants. Moreover, some studies have shown cellulosic ethanol to be more cost effective and economically sustainable than corn-based ethanol. Sandia National Laboratories conducts in-house cellulosic ethanol research  and is also a member of the Joint BioEnergy Institute (JBEI), a research institute founded by the United States Department of Energy with the goal of developing cellulosic biofuels.

Over $1 billion of federal money has been spent on the research and development of hydrogen fuel in the United States. Both the NREL and SNL have departments dedicated to hydrogen research.

Employment 
Accurate estimates regarding job creation as a result of an increasing reliance on renewable energy in the United States are challenging to predict due to unforeseen technological developments, uncertainty surrounding the United States’ future import/export levels of renewable energy technology, and ambiguity regarding indirect and induced employment effects. That being said, however, it is very likely that the United States would see a net increase in employment in the energy sector as a result of a renewable energy transition. A study performed by Wei, Patadia, and Kammen about renewable energy efficiency in the United States found that the renewable energy sector generates significantly more jobs than the fossil fuel sector based on the per energy unit delivered. The renewable energies found to have the highest employment per energy unit generated ratios are solar and wind; this is likely due to their installation components. Although net employment would vary per location within the U.S. (for example, West Virginia's net employment would be more adversely impacted than California's due to West Virginia's coal mining industry), in total, net employment in the energy sector within the U.S. is projected to considerably increase. The increase in direct employment as well as increased renewable energy infrastructure would naturally lead to additional indirect and induced jobs as well.

Research done on countries in the European Union has affirmed this positive net employment notion. Towards a green energy economy? Tracking the employment effects of low-carbon technologies in the European Union, a study done by Markandya et al. used a multi-regional input-output model in conjunction with the World Input-Output Database to analyze data from 1995 - 2009 in search of net employment impacts. These years were specifically considered as the European Union's energy structure was shifting significantly towards gas and other renewable forms of energy during this time. Although the country specific affects varied, it was found that 530,000 jobs overall were netted from the transition during this timeframe. Another study done on Germany by Lehr, Lutz, and Edler used the PANTA RHEI model to evaluate the German energy situation by taking positive and negative renewable energy impacts into account. The model considered different assumptions for fossil fuel prices, domestic installations, international trade, and German exports to developing renewable energy world markets. Under almost all of the scenarios, positive net employment effects were exhibited.

Public opinion

A 2010 survey conducted by Applied Materials shows that two-thirds of Americans believe solar technology should play a greater role in meeting the country's energy needs. In addition, "three-quarters of Americans feel that increasing renewable energy and decreasing U.S. dependence on foreign oil are the country's top energy priorities". According to the survey, "67 percent of Americans would be willing to pay more for their monthly utility bill if their utility company increased its use of renewable energy".

In a 2010 Chicago Council on Global Affairs public opinion survey, an overwhelming 91 percent believed "investing in renewable energy" is important for the United States to remain economically competitive with other countries, with 62 percent considering this very important. The same poll found strong support for tax incentives to encourage development of renewable energy sources specifically as a way to reduce foreign energy imports. Eight in ten (80 percent) favored tax incentives, 47 percent strongly, and only 17 percent were opposed.

The Chicago Council on Global Affairs (2010) in the public opinion survey also found that approximately 65% of the Americans supported increased fuel efficiencies of the products of the auto makers, irrespective of the price escalation that would be associated with the implementation .

Public Surveys conducted by World Public Opinion in 2008 also revealed that 79% of the Americans were of the notion that a major shift to alternative sources of energy is economically beneficial in the long run.

According to a 2019 CBS News poll on 2,143 U.S. residents, 42% of American adults under 45 years old thought that the U.S. could realistically transition to 100% renewable energy by 2050 while 29% deemed it unrealistic and 29% were unsure. Those numbers for older Americans are 34%, 40%, and 25%, respectively. Differences in opinion might be due to education as younger Americans are more likely to have been taught about climate change in schools than their elders.

Policy and promotion
The Energy Policy Act of 2005 requires all public electric utilities to facilitate net metering.  This allows homes and businesses performing distributed generation to pay only the net cost of electricity from the grid: electricity used minus electricity produced locally and sent back into the grid.  For intermittent renewable energy sources this effectively uses the grid as a battery to smooth over lulls and fill in production gaps.

Some jurisdictions go one step further and have instituted feed-in tariff, which allows any power customer to actually make money by producing more renewable energy than is consumed locally.

From 2006 to 2014, US households received more than $18 billion in federal income tax credits for weatherizing their homes, installing solar panels, buying hybrid and electric vehicles, and other "clean energy" investments. These tax expenditures went predominantly to higher-income Americans. The bottom three income quintiles received about 10% of all credits, while the top quintile received about 60%. The most extreme is the program aimed at electric vehicles, where the top income quintile received about 90% of all credits. Market mechanisms have less skewed distributional effects.

The American Recovery and Reinvestment Act of 2009 included more than $70 billion in direct spending and tax credits for clean energy and associated transportation programs. This policy-stimulus combination represents the largest federal commitment in United States history for renewable energy, advanced transportation, and energy conservation initiatives. These new initiatives were expected to encourage many more utilities to strengthen their clean energy programs. While the Department of Energy has come under criticism for providing loan guarantees to Solyndra, its SunShot initiative has funded successful companies such as EnergySage and Zep Solar.

In his January 24, 2012, State of the Union address, President Barack Obama restated his commitment to renewable energy, stating that he “will not walk away from the promise of clean energy.” Obama called for a commitment by the Defense Department to purchase 1,000 MW of renewable energy. He also mentioned the long-standing Interior Department commitment to permit 10,000 MW of renewable energy projects on public land in 2012.

Some Environmental Protection Agency facilities in the United States use renewable energy for all or part of their supply at the following facilities.

Energy technologies receive government subsidies. 
In 2016, federal government energy-specific subsidies and supports for renewables, fossil fuels, and nuclear energy were $6,682 million, $489 million and $365 million, respectively. 

All but a few U.S. states now have incentives in place to promote renewable energy, while more than a dozen have enacted new renewable energy laws in recent years. 
Renewable energy suffered a political setback in the United States in September 2011 with the bankruptcy of Solyndra, a company that had received a $535 million federal loan guarantee.

Net metering

Initiatives

SunShot 
In February 2011, the U.S. Department of Energy (DOE) launched its SunShot Initiative, a collaborative national effort to cut the total cost of photovoltaic solar energy systems by 75% by 2020. Reaching this goal would make unsubsidized solar energy cost-competitive with other forms of electricity and get grid parity . The SunShot initiative included a crowdsourced innovation program run in partnership with Topcoder, during which 17 different solar energy application solutions were developed in 60 days. In 2011, the price was $4/W, and the SunShot goal of $1/W by 2020 was reached in 2017.

Wind Powering America
Wind Powering America (WPA) is another DOE initiative that seeks to increase the use of wind energy. WPA collaborates with state and regional stakeholders, including farmers, ranchers, Native Americans, rural electric cooperatives, consumer-owned utilities and schools.

WPA has focused on states with strong potential for wind energy generation but with few operational projects. WPA provides information about the challenges, benefits, and impacts of wind technology implementation.

Solar America Initiative 
The Solar America Initiative (SAI) is a part of the Federal Advanced Energy Initiative to accelerate the development of advanced photovoltaic materials with the goal of making it cost-competitive with other forms of renewable electricity by 2015.

The DOE Solar Energy Technology Program (SETP) intended to achieve the goals of the SAI through partnerships and strategic alliances by focusing primarily on four areas:

Market Transformation — activities that address marketplace barriers
Device and Process Proof of Concept — R&D activities that address novel devices or processes with significant performance or cost advantages
Component Prototype and Pilot-Scale Production — R&D activities emphasizing development of prototype photovoltaic (PV) components or systems at pilot-scale with demonstrated cost, reliability or performance advantages
System Development and Manufacturing — collaborative R&D activities among industry and university partners

California Solar Initiative
As part of former Governor Arnold Schwarzenegger's Million Solar Roofs Program, California set a goal to create 3,000 megawatts of new, solar-produced electricity by 2017, with funding of $2.8 billion.

The California Solar Initiative offers cash incentives on solar PV systems of up to $2.50 a watt. These incentives, combined with federal tax incentives, can cover up to 50% of the total cost of a solar panel system. Financial incentives to support renewable energy are available in some other US states.

Green Power Partnership 
The EPA named the top 20 partners in its Green Power Partnership that are generating their own renewable energy on-site. Combined, they generate more than 736 million kilowatt-hours of renewable energy on-site each year, enough to power more than 61,000 average U.S. homes.

Renewable portfolio standards
A Renewable Portfolio Standard refers to legislation that creates a market in tradeable renewable or green electricity certificates. Electricity distributors or wholesaler purchasers of electricity are required to source a specified percentage of their electricity (portfolio) from renewable generation sources. Liable entities that fall short of their quota can purchase certificates from accredited suppliers who have generated renewable electricity and obtained and registered certificates to sell on that market.

Renewable energy organizations
The American Council on Renewable Energy (ACORE), is a non-profit organization with headquarters in Washington, D.C. It was founded in 2001 as a unifying forum for bringing renewable energy into the mainstream of America's economy and lifestyle. In 2010 ACORE had over 700 member organizations. In 2007, ACORE published Outlook On Renewable Energy In America, a two volume report about the future of renewable energy in the United States.  It has been said that this report exposes a "new reality for renewable energy in America."

The Environmental and Energy Study Institute (EESI) is a non-profit organization which promotes environmentally sustainable societies.  Founded in 1984 by a group of Congressional Members, EESI seeks to be a catalyst that moves society away from environmentally damaging fossil fuels and toward a clean energy future. EESI presents policy solutions that will result in decreased global warming and air pollution; improvements in public health, energy security and rural economic development opportunities; increased use of renewable energy sources and improved energy efficiency.

An important part of the mission of the National Renewable Energy Laboratory (NREL) is the transfer of NREL-developed technologies to renewable energy markets. NREL's Technology Transfer Office supports laboratory scientists and engineers in the successful and practical application of their expertise and the technologies they develop. R&D staff and facilities are recognized and valued by industry, as demonstrated through many collaborative research projects and licensed technologies with public and private partners. NREL's innovative technologies have also been recognized with 39 R&D 100 Awards.

The Rocky Mountain Institute (RMI) is an organization dedicated to research, publication, consulting, and lecturing in the general field of sustainability, with a special focus on profitable innovations for energy and resource efficiency. RMI is headquartered in Snowmass, Colorado, and also maintains offices in Boulder, Colorado. RMI is the publisher of the book Winning the Oil Endgame.

Potential resources
The United States has the potential of installing 11 terawatt (TW) of onshore wind power and 4 TW of offshore wind power, capable of generating over 47,000 TWh. 
The potential for concentrated solar power in the southwest is estimated at 10 to 20 TW, capable of generating over 10,000 TWh.

A 2012 report by the National Renewable Energy Laboratory evaluates the potential energy resources for each state of the United States.

In 2010, the United States used 3,754 TWh of electricity. Total energy used in 2010 was 28,800 TWh (98.16 quadrillion BTU), with over 30% thermal losses .

Note: Total use is inflated to create an oil equivalence.

Historical data

See also

American Council on Renewable Energy
Americas Energy and Climate Symposium
Catching the Sun (film)
Energy conservation in the United States
Efficient energy use
Energy policy of the United States
Lists of renewable energy topics
List of wind farms in the United States
List of U.S. states by electricity production from renewable sources
Renewable energy by country
Renewable energy commercialization
Little Box Challenge

References

Further reading
 GA Mansoori, N Enayati, LB Agyarko (2016), Energy: Sources, Utilization, Legislation, Sustainability, Illinois as Model State, World Sci. Pub. Co., 
Clean Tech Nation: How the U.S. Can Lead in the New Global Economy (2012) by Ron Pernick and Clint Wilder
Deploying Renewables 2011 (2011) by the International Energy Agency
Reinventing Fire: Bold Business Solutions for the New Energy Era (2011) by Amory Lovins
Renewable Energy and Energy Efficiency Incentives: A Summary of Federal Programs (December 14, 2016) by the Congressional Research Service
Renewable Energy Sources and Climate Change Mitigation (2011) by the IPCC
Solar Energy Perspectives (2011) by the International Energy Agency

External links
U.S. Renewable Energy Factsheet by the University of Michigan's Center for Sustainable Systems

 
Energy in the United States